Jeff Dowd (born November 20, 1949) is an American film producer and political activist.

Biography
He was a member of the "Seattle Seven," who were jailed for contempt of court following a violent protest against the Vietnam War. He later moved to Los Angeles and became an independent movie producer and promoter, producing such films as Zebrahead. He met the Coen brothers while they were promoting their first film, Blood Simple, and is the basis for their character Jeffrey "The Dude" Lebowski from The Big Lebowski.

In 2009, Dowd was involved in an altercation with movie critic John Anderson at the Sundance Film Festival, after Anderson panned Dirt! The Movie, a film Dowd produced. Anderson was eating breakfast when Dowd reportedly confronted him, and then incited a food fight and brief melee at the Yarrow Hotel Restaurant. Dowd did not press charges.

In 2011, Dowd was the subject of an 18-minute documentary-short directed by Jeff Feuerzeig and broadcast on the USA Network as part of its "Character" series.

Filmography
FernGully: The Last Rainforest (1992) (co-executive producer)
Zebrahead (1992) (producer)
Cement (1999) (co-executive producer)
The Last Game (2002) (TV) (executive producer)
Ocean of Pearls (2008) (executive producer)

References

External links
 
 The Dude's Film School

1949 births
Living people
American film producers
American anti–Vietnam War activists